The 2017 La Flèche Wallonne Féminine was the 20th edition of the La Flèche Wallonne Féminine one-day women's road bicycle race held in Belgium, starting and ending in the town of Huy. The race included two climbs of the Mur de Huy; the finish line was at the top of the second of these ascents.

The race was won by Anna van der Breggen.

Teams 
Twenty-four teams participated in the race. Each team had a maximum of six riders:

Results

References

La Fleche Wallonne Feminine
La Flèche Wallonne Feminine
La Fleche Wallonne Feminine